Jaan Õunapuu (born 13 September 1958 in Mustjala) is an Estonian politician. From 1993 until 2003, he was the governor Tartu County. In 2003, he became the Estonian Minister of Regional Affairs; a position he held until 2007. He has been member of XI and XII Riigikogu.

From 2016 until 2017 Õunapuu was the Deputy Mayor of Tartu. He is a member of Estonian Social Democratic Party.

References

1958 births
Living people
People's Union of Estonia politicians
Social Democratic Party (Estonia) politicians
Members of the Riigikogu, 2007–2011
Members of the Riigikogu, 2011–2015
Government ministers of Estonia
Recipients of the Order of the White Star, 3rd Class
Estonian University of Life Sciences alumni
People from Saaremaa Parish
Members of the Riigikogu, 2003–2007